Nebojša "Glogi" Glogovac (30 August 19699 February 2018) was an award-winning Serbian actor, notable for performances in theater, television and film.

He was a member of the Children's Drama Group of the Serbian Radio and television, and he began his acting career at the Youth Atelier in Pančevo. In 1996, he received a scholarship from the Yugoslav Drama Theater and a role in the play The Great Robbery, directed by Dejan Mijač on the stage of Atelje 212. When he was a child, he appeared in the television show Price iz Nepricave (Stories from Nepricava) in 1981. He had his first film role in 1993 in the short film Rekvijem za jedan san (Requiem for a Dream) in the lead role, and after that the same year in the play Paradise by Petar Zec, where he was also one of the main actors. After drawing attention to his talent, he landed a role in director Gorčin Stojanović's film, Premeditated murder in 1995.

He played the main roles in the films Premeditated murder, Cabaret Balkan, Sky Hook, When I Grow Up, I'll Be a Kangaroo, Klopka, Hadersfild, The Woman with a Broken Nose, The Man Who Defended Gavrilo Princip, Circles, 
Ravna Gora and the Constitution. He has been awarded many times for his roles in theater and film, and the Sterija Award, Tsar Constantine in Niš and the Golden Arena in Pula for the best male role stand out.

He died after a short and severe illness, at the Institute of Oncology and Radiology of Serbia in Belgrade, on 9 February 2018.

Biography
Nebojša Glogovac was born on 30 August 1969 in Trebinje in FR Bosnia and Herzegovina to father Milovan and mother Milena Glogovac, and he proudly pointed out that he is Herzegovinian. He moved with his family from Trebinje to Opovo in 1974, and a year and a half later to Pančevo, where Nebojsa's father was ordained a priest in the Church of the Assumption.

Nebojsa spent his first years living in Trebinje in a part of the city called Bregovi. He spent his early childhood playing with children in the yard near the Bey's house. As a child, he wanted to become a policeman, because of the policeman Jovan Bulj, who was his first idol.

During his education at the Jovan Jovanović Zmaj primary school, he also attended the Jovan Bandur Music school, clarinet department. After finishing primary school, he did not have enough qualification points to enter secondary school, so he enrolled in the "Technical School May 23rd" and after half a year he transferred to secondary school. He attended the Uroš Predić Gymnasium in Pancevo, and after the third year he decided to study natural sciences.

After high school he enrolled in psychology studies at the Faculty of Philosophy in Belgrade. After two years of studies, he changed his mind and in 1990 he enrolled in acting at the Belgrade Faculty of Dramatic Arts in the class of Professor Vladimir Jevtović. Gorica Popović was the assistant at the entrance exam for the university and Glogovac recited the song "Vragolije" by Branko Radićević. Nataša Ninković, Nela Mihailović, Daniela Kuzmanović, Danijela Ugrenović, Karolina Cimeša, Vojin Ćetković, Sergej Trifunović and Boris Pingović studied together with Glogovac. Class assistants were Varja Đukić and Gordana Marić. During his studies, he played the role of school friend of Slobodan Popadić in the series Bolji život (1987).

While attending high school from 1985 and while studying at the Faculty of Philosophy in Belgrade, Glogovac was a member of the Youth Studio in Pančevo, and remained there until 1990, when he enrolled in the Faculty of Dramatic Arts at the persuasion of Milenko Zablaćanski and soon after he became a member of the Yugoslavian Drama Theater. He had his first role "Mušica" in December 1989, and the play was directed by Milenko Zablaćanski, written by Eugène Ionesco. Glogovac played his first professional role in the Pančevo Cultural Center in 1990 in the play Živela sloboda, where he played the role of a German.

When he was twelve years old he became a member of the Children's Drama Group of the Radio Belgrade studio, with Miroslav Mika Aleksić, where he stayed for a full six years and played in several plays. In 1981. he first appeared on television, where he had a small role in television series Priče iz Nepričave.

In addition to acting he was a passionate lover of horseback riding, dogs, backgammon, cars and motorcycles, he loved cooking, and in his childhood he practiced handball. He loved to draw, and from his student days until his death he wrote poetry. He was a member of the Association for Galloping Sport of Serbia and the Association of Dramatic Artists of Serbia. He supported Crvena zvezda and was a candidate for a member The assembly of FC Crvena zvezda in the first direct elections 2012. year. Together with his colleague Goran Šušljik he founded the film production company -{Eye to Eye}- whose debut was the movie Hadersfild.

Glogovac was the official promoter of the derby match of the 8th round of the Serbian Super League playoffs in handball between Partizan and Crvena Zvezda, which was played in March 2014, and was of a humanitarian nature, to help those threatened by floods in Serbia in 2014.

In Belgrade he lived on Gundulićev venac, briefly on Bežanijska Kosa, and then on Dorćol.

In addition to acting he taught acting at Theater 78, at the "First Steps" acting school in Belgrade and at the "Mask" acting school.

He acted in a large number of humanitarian plays for children, donated money for the restoration of churches and monasteries, and repeatedly helped his colleagues from the acting stage financially. In 2009, he appeared in a commercial, as part of a campaign promoting the fight against breast cancer. The following year, he cut a lock of his hair as a sign of support for children suffering from cancer and their parents, as part of the Strand of Hope campaign. He participated in the charity campaign WannaGive – Because someone else's happiness is my happiness, organized by UNICEF ​​and Wannabe magazine. He was one of the participants in the "Cherish Serbian language" campaign.

Glogovac's stories about the relationship between man and dog are represented in the books Paw in the Hand and Shine in the Eyes. It is represented in the 2018 books Untold Stories by Croatian director Rajko Grlić and Ne damo svetinje by Serbian poet Slavko Perošević.

Glogovic's role models were the Soviet and Russian actor Innokenty Smoktunovsky and the Serbian actor Milenko Zablaćanski. He repeatedly refused roles in foreign films, those he considered propaganda against the Serbian people, including a role in the film In the Land of Blood and Honey. He also emphasized that he is not interested in a career abroad, where he would play Slovenian pimps and criminals, as well as because he has an established status as an actor in Serbia.

Death

After a short but severe battle with lung cancer, Glogovac died at the age of 48, on 9 February 2018, in Belgrade's Institute for Oncology and Radiology of Serbia. He is survived by his second wife and three children.

Selected filmography

 Bolji život (1987, TV Series) .... Boba's schoolmate
 Raj (a.k.a. Heaven) (International: English title) (1993, TV Movie) – Birimić
 Vukovar poste restante (a.k.a. Vukovar) (1994) .... Fadil
 Ubistvo s predumišljajem (a.k.a. Premeditated Murder, USA) (1995) .... Bogdan Bilogorac
 Do koske (a.k.a. Rage) (1996) .... Simke
 Pokondirena tikva (1997, TV Movie) .... Jovan
 Porodično blago (1998, TV Series) .... Zlatko Gavrilović
 Savior (1998) .... Vera's Brother
 Bure baruta (a.k.a. Baril de poudre (France)) (a.k.a. Cabaret Balkan (United States)) (a.k.a. The Powder Keg) (1999) .... The Chain-Smoking Taxi Driver
 Hotel Belgrad (1999, Short) .... Igor
 Ranjena zemlja (1999) .... Marko
 Nebeska udica (a.k.a. Sky Hook (International: English title) (2000) .... Kaja
 Normalni ljudi (2001) .... Toma
 Munje! (a.k.a. Dudes (International: English title: festival title)) (a.k.a. Thunderbirds (International: English title: festival title)) (2001) .... Pandur
 Boomerang (2001) .... Miki
 T.T. Sindrom (2002) (a.k.a. T.T. Syndrome (Europe: English title)' .... Vaki
 Porodično blago 2 (2001, TV Series) .... Zlatko Gavrilović
 Država mrtvih (a.k.a. Janez) (2002) .... Gorazd Kranjc
 Kad porastem biću Kengur (2004) .... Žika Živac, taksista
 Lift (2004, TV Series) .... Prvoslav Gajin, oficir
 Košarkaši (2005, TV Series) .... Žare
 Poroka (2005) .... Tašta
 Tomorrow Morning (2006) .... Mare
 The Optimists (2006) .... Dr Milo Petrović
 Klopka (2007) .... Mladen
 Hadersfild (a.k.a. Huddersfield) (2007) .... Ivan, the neighbour
 Technotise: Edit & I (2009) .... Edi (voice)
 Kenjac (2009) .... Boro
 Zena sa slomljenim nosem (2010) .... Čamango
 72 Days (2010) .... Policajac Dane
 White White World (2010) .... Zlatan
 When Day Breaks (2012) .... Mališa
 Artiljero (2012) .... Zlaja
 Circles (2013) .... Nebojša
 S/Kidanje (2013) .... Bojan
 The Kids from the Marx and Engels Street (2014) .... Tata
 Jednaki (2014) .... (segment "Milan")
 The Man Who Defended Gavrilo Princip (2014) .... Leo Pfefer
 Enklava (2015) .... Vojislav Arsić
 Za kralja i otadžbinu (2015) .... Dragoljub Mihailović
 Otadžbina (2015) .... Bole / banquet hall owner
 The Liberation of Skopje (2016) .... Dušan
 The Constitution (2016) .... Vjeko Kralj
 Saga o 3 nevina muskarca (2017) .... Damjanov stric
 The Books of Knjige: Slucajevi Pravde (2017) .... Bledi Globičic Prokopnik
 Nemanjići – rađanje kraljevine (2017, TV Series) .... Vukan Nemanjić
 South Wind (2018) .... Golub
 Zaspanka za vojnike (2019) .... Seljak
 Moj jutarnji smeh (2019) .... Miloš

References

Bibliography

External links

 
 (VIDEO) Šekspirovi monolozi: on Nedeljnik.rs

1969 births
2018 deaths
Serbian male television actors
Serbian male voice actors
People from Trebinje
Serbian male film actors
Serbs of Bosnia and Herzegovina
Golden Arena winners
Zoran Radmilović Award winners
Miloš Žutić Award winners
Laureates of the Ring of Dobrica